Berkshire Village Historic District is a national historic district located at Berkshire in Tioga County, New York.  The district includes 17 properties with 25 contributing buildings, including 13 historic residences.  The buildings date from about 1820 to 1932.

It was listed on the National Register of Historic Places in 1984.

References

Historic districts on the National Register of Historic Places in New York (state)
Historic districts in Tioga County, New York
National Register of Historic Places in Tioga County, New York